Royal Inns of America was a chain of hotels in the United States, headquartered in San Diego. The company was founded in 1965 by Earl Gagosian.

Company timeline
1965 - "Royal Inns of America" founded
1971 - Operating 56 hotels
1975 - Files for bankruptcy

Locations

Palm Springs, California
First Royal Inn - opened late 1965.

Santa Monica, California
First high-rise Royal Inn.

Chula Vista, California
Opened 1971.

Anaheim, California
Opened October 16, 1971, the Royal Inn of Anaheim had 500 rooms, and two restaurants - Earl’s Seafood Grotto and Cocktail Lounge and Jolly King Family Restaurant. Following the collapse of the company itself, Royal Inns sold the hotel in August 1976 to hotelier Jack Wrather, where it was re-named "The Inn At The Park". It then underwent numerous changes of ownership, and is currently the Sheraton Park Hotel.

Paradise, Las Vegas

Demolished February 10, 2015.

Lake Buena Vista, Florida
Located within Walt Disney World in Florida; now the B Resort & Spa Lake Buena Vista.

See also
List of defunct hotel chains

References

Hotels established in 1965
Defunct hotel chains
Defunct companies based in California